Lacinipolia parvula is a moth of the family Noctuidae first described by Gottlieb August Wilhelm Herrich-Schäffer in 1868. It is found in Florida and on Cuba and Puerto Rico.

The wingspan is 23–26 mm.

References

Moths described in 1868
Orthosiini